Lost Sirens is the ninth studio album by English rock band New Order. It was released on 11 January 2013 by Rhino Entertainment. The tracks featured on the album were recorded during the production of 2005's Waiting for the Sirens' Call.

It is the final album featuring bassist Peter Hook, who left the band in 2007 (almost 6 years before the album's release), and the only album by New Order produced from archival recordings. Lost Sirens drew mostly positive reviews, and it sold 4,678 copies in its first week in the United Kingdom.

Production
As with Waiting for the Sirens' Call, Lost Sirens was written and performed by Bernard Sumner, Peter Hook, Stephen Morris and Phil Cunningham. It is the second New Order album recorded without Gillian Gilbert who left the band in 2001 to look after her family. The album was recorded at Real World Studios between 2003 and 2004; the production cost for the songs on both albums totalled £700,000.

The songs featured on Lost Sirens were originally intended for an album to be released shortly after Waiting for the Sirens' Call, but the songs were shelved after Hook left the group in 2007, and the album was never finished as planned.

"Hellbent" was previously released in 2011 as part of the compilation album Total: From Joy Division to New Order.

Release
Lost Sirens was originally scheduled for release in late 2012. In a Brazilian interview to promote the reunited band's appearance in São Paulo, Gilbert acknowledged issues with former member Hook, and stated there was "a lot going on behind the scenes on the copyright" delaying the album. The band announced in December 2012 that the album would be released on 14 January 2013. Prior to release, the album was streamed on the Rolling Stone official website from 11 January 2013.

Critical reception

Lost Sirens received generally positive reviews from music critics. At Metacritic, which assigns a normalised rating out of 100 to reviews from mainstream publications, the album received an average score of 65, based on 14 reviews.

The Independents Andy Gill claimed that New Order's ninth outing "actually bests its parent album [Waiting for the Sirens' Call]". Gill particularly cited "I Told You So", "Sugarcane" and "Hellbent" as the album's better tracks. Metro stated the album "offers few classics but will still delight fans of the band with its feelgood sound".

Track listing

Personnel
Credits adapted from the liner notes of Lost Sirens.

 New Order – production
 Stephen Street – production, mixing 
 Cenzo Townshend – mixing 
 Tore Johansson – production 
 Jim Spencer – production ; mixing 
 Mac Quayle – production 
 Stuart Price – production 
 Frank Arkwright – mastering
 Gary Lancaster – project management
 Studio Parris Wakefield – art direction, design

Charts

Release history

References

External links

2013 albums
Albums produced by John Leckie
Albums produced by Stephen Street
Albums produced by Stuart Price
New Order (band) albums
Rhino Records albums